"Finer Things" is a song by American rapper Polo G. It was first released in August 2018, before being released through streaming services on November 30, 2018. Upon the song's release, it gained millions of streams and views, helping Polo G rise to fame. The song is also the lead single from his debut studio album Die a Legend (2019).

Background and composition
Polo G wrote the song in the middle of 2018, while he was in jail. The song marks the beginning of his adoption of a melodic approach to rapping, distinct from his drill style.

Music video
A music video for the song was released in August 2018. It sees Polo G on the streets with his friends, as well as interspersed clips of him and his family at a beach.

Certifications

References

2018 singles
2018 songs
Polo G songs
Songs written by Polo G
Songs about violence
Columbia Records singles